The 1985 St. Louis mayoral election was held on April 2, 1985 to elect the mayor of St. Louis, Missouri. It saw the re-election of Vincent C. Schoemehl to a second term.

The election was preceded by party primaries on March 5.

Democratic primary

General election

References

Mayoral elections in St. Louis
St. Louis
1985 in Missouri